Sharchchandra Muktibodh (Devanagari: शरच्चंद्र मुक्तिबोध; 1921 – 21 November 1984) was a Marathi poet, novelist and literary critic from Maharashtra, India.

Biography
Muktibodh was born in 1921. He completed his Master of Arts in 1947 from Nagpur University. He started his career as a deputy director in the language department of government. In 1957, he joined Nagpur Mahavidyalaya as a lecturer, from where he retired in 1979.

Muktibodh died on 21 November 1984. His elder brother Gajanan Madhav Muktibodh was also a poet and writer of Hindi literature.

Literary works

Novels
 Sarahadda (सरहद्द)
 Jan He Wolatu Jethe (जन हे वोळतु जेथे)
 Kshipra (क्षिप्रा)

Collections of poems
 Nawi Malawat (नवी मळवाट)
 Satyachi Jat (सत्याची जात)
 Yatrik (यात्रिक)
 Muktibodhanchi Niwadak Kavita (मुक्तिबोधांची निवडक कविता)

Awards
Muktibodh received the Sahitya Akademi Award in 1979 for his critical work Srushti, Saundarya Ani Sahityamoolya (सृष्टि, सौंदर्य आणि साहित्यमूल्य).

References

Marathi-language writers
1921 births
1984 deaths
20th-century Indian poets
Indian male poets
Poets from Maharashtra
20th-century Indian male writers
Recipients of the Sahitya Akademi Award in Marathi